Seeds from the Underground is the thirteenth studio album by Kenny Garrett. It was released on April 10, 2012, on Mack Avenue Records and received two Grammy nominations in Best Jazz Instrumental Album and Best Improvised Jazz Solo categories, as well as a NAACP Image Award nomination in Outstanding Jazz Album category, a Soul Train Award nomination in Best Traditional Jazz Artist/Group category, a Jazz Awards nomination for Alto Saxophonist of the Year and an Echo Award win in the Saxophonist of the Year category. It features Garrett in a quintet with pianist Benito Gonzalez, bassist Nat Reeves, percussionist Rudy Bird and drummer Ronald Bruner, along with a small choir.

Critical reception 
The album received a 77/100 score on Metacritic, based on four reviews from mainstream media.

Track listing

Personnel 
Musicians
Kenny Garrett – piano, alto saxophone, soprano saxophone
Benito Gonzalez – piano
Nat Reeves – bass
Ronald Bruner – drums
Rudy Bird – bata, percussion, vocals
Donald Brown – vocals
Rusty Chops – vocals
Sengbe Kona Khasu – vocals
Nedelka Prescod – vocals
Misha Tarasov – vocals

Production
Kenny Garrett – producer
Donald Brown – producer
Maria Ehrenreich – producer
Gretchen Valade – executive producer, liner notes
Greg Calbi – engineer (mastering)
Todd Whitelock	 – engineer (mixing)
Fernando Lodeiro – assistant engineer
Tim Marchiafava – assistant engineer
Damon Whittemore – assistant engineer

Will Wakefield – production manager
Tino Passante – studio manager
Randall Kennedy – creative director
Timothy Zach – art direction, design
Keith Major – photography

Awards and nominations

Chart positions

References 

Mack Avenue Records albums
Kenny Garrett albums
2012 albums